Business Casual is the debut studio album by American band Beep Beep. It was released August 24, 2004 on Saddle Creek Records.

This album is the 63rd release of Saddle Creek Records.

Critical reception
Business Casual  was met with "mixed or average" reviews from critics. At Metacritic, which assigns a weighted average rating out of 100 to reviews from mainstream publications, this release received an average score of 53 based on 13 reviews.

In a review for Pitchfork, critic reviewer Brian Howe wrote: "One can't accuse Beep Beep of being lackluster or uninspired. Business Casual is fierce and competent, and evinces the rippling of powerful musical muscles. But its affectations are so grating that it's tough to make it through it all in a single listen."

Track listing

Musicians
Eric Bemberger
Chris Hughes
Katie Muth
Mike Sweeney
AJ Mogis - Hammond B-3, Mellowtron, Octave Cat, Engineering
Andy LeMaster - Mixing
Doug Van Sloun - Mastering
Joel Peterson - Nord Lead2

References

External links
I Love Beep Beep official website
Saddle Creek Records

2004 albums
Saddle Creek Records albums
Beep Beep (band) albums